The Sacramento Open was a golf tournament on the PGA Tour from 1926 to 1938. It was held in Sacramento, California at two different courses. In the 1920s, it was played at the Del Paso Country Club. In the 1930s, it was played at a municipal course that is now part of the Haggin Oaks Golf Complex.

Winners
1938 Johnny Revolta
1937 Ed Dudley
1936 Wiffy Cox
1935 Harold "Jug" McSpaden
1929-34 No tournament
1928 Tommy Armour
1927 No tournament
1926 Joe Turnesa

See also
Sacramento Open - a 1950s-60s LPGA Tour event

External links
Del Paso Country Club
Haggin Oaks Golf Complex

Former PGA Tour events
Golf in California
Sports in Sacramento, California